Corroboree Rock Conservation Reserve is a protected area in the Northern Territory of Australia located about  east of Alice Springs  in the East MacDonnell Ranges.

The reserve is surrounded by the Undoolya pastoral lease which operates as a cattle station.

The reserve takes its name from a column of grey dolomite of great significance to the local Aboriginal people. The rock is part of the Bitter Springs formation that was deposited in salt lakes 800 million years ago. It is a sacred site to the Eastern Arrente peoples

Flora found on the reserve include spinifex and senna on the ridges, with bloodwood, Supplejack, Red Mallee and Whitewood are found around the base of the rock.

See also
Protected areas of the Northern Territory

References

Conservation reserves in the Northern Territory
Protected areas established in 1962
1962 establishments in Australia